Roquessels (Languedocien: Ròcacèls) is a commune in the Hérault department in the Occitanie region in southern France.

Population

Inhabitants of Roquessels are called Roquesselois

Winemaking
Roquessels is one of the seven communes which produces Faugères AOC wine.

Sights
Above the village stands the ruined mediaeval castle, the Château de Roquessels. The castle chapel still stands and is a listed historic site.

See also
Communes of the Hérault department

References

Communes of Hérault